Karen Breschi (born 1941) is an American ceramic artist. Her work is included in the collections of the Smithsonian American Art Museum, the Oakland Museum of California, the San Francisco Museum of Modern Art and the Museum of Contemporary Art, Chicago

References

Living people
1941 births
Artists from Oakland, California
American ceramists
20th-century American women artists
21st-century American women artists